Alexis "Tschuli" Pantchoulidzew (18 September 1888, Pyatigorsk, Russia – 10 April 1968, Diepenheim, the Netherlands) was a Russian-born Dutch nobleman and equestrian. He was a long-term partner of Princess Armgard of Sierstorpff-Cramm and mentor to her son, Prince Bernhard of Lippe-Biesterfeld. As equestrian, he was the only competitor for the Netherlands at the Dutch-boycotted 1956 Summer Olympics; aged 67, he was also the eldest participant at those Olympics and the eldest Dutch Olympian ever.

Biography
Pantchoulidzew was born into the noble Russian-Georgian Pantchoulidzew family, in Pyatigorsk, a town close to Georgia where he served with the cavalry. After the revolution of 1917 he fled Russia and eventually settled in Germany. There he became a Stable Master of Princess Armgard of Sierstorpff-Cramm and a mentor to her son, Prince Bernhard of Lippe-Biesterfeld, with whom he shared a passion for horse riding. Bernhard learned riding from Pantchoulidzew, and together they took part in international competitions. After the death of her husband Pantchoulidzew became a long-term partner of Princess Armgard and settled with her in the Netherlands, where he was naturalised in 1953. Pantchouldidzew was also appointed by the FEI the international governing body of horse sports in Switzerland, as an official member of the jury d'appel for the showjumping competition at the 1956 Olympic Games in Stockholm.

1956 Olympics
After World War II, Bernhard became a patron to Pantchoulidzew. Being a Dutch prince and president of the International Federation for Equestrian Sports (since 1954),
he arranged that Pantchoulidzew received Dutch citizenship and was the only Dutch competitor at the 1956 Stockholm Equestrian Games.

The Netherlands boycotted the 1956 Summer Olympics in Melbourne, Australia, because of the Soviet Union's invasion of Hungary. However, the strict Australian quarantine regulations resulted in the Olympic equestrian events being held in Stockholm, Sweden, five months earlier, and, with the help of Bernhard, Pantchoulidzew was allowed to participate at his own expense. He took part in the individual Grand Prix dressage with the horse Lascar that did belong to Prince Bernhard. He finished in 28th place among 36 participants, in presence of the Dutch Prince and Princess Armgard of Sierstorpff-Cramm. To his disadvantage, he had to start first, and thus could not adjust his performance to competitors.

References

1888 births
1968 deaths
Dutch dressage riders
Equestrians at the 1956 Summer Olympics
Olympic equestrians of the Netherlands
Dutch male equestrians
Emigrants from the Russian Empire to the Netherlands
People from Pyatigorsk